Jacqueline Janzen (born November 29, 1993 in Villingen-Schwenningen, Germany) is a German ice hockey forward.

International career

Janzen was selected for the Germany women's national ice hockey team in the 2014 Winter Olympics. She played in all five games, recording one assist.

As of 2014, Janzen has also appeared for Germany at one IIHF Women's World Championships, in 2011.

Janzen made three appearances for the Germany women's national under-18 ice hockey team, at the IIHF World Women's U18 Championships, with the first in 2009.

Career statistics

International career
Through 2013-14 season

References

External links
 
 
 
 
 

1993 births
People from Villingen-Schwenningen
Sportspeople from Freiburg (region)
Living people
Olympic ice hockey players of Germany
Ice hockey players at the 2014 Winter Olympics
German women's ice hockey forwards